Cladonia asahinae, the pixie cup lichen or Asahina's cup lichen, is a species of cup lichen in the Cladoniaceae family. It grows on moss, particularly Chorisodontium aciphyllum, Polytrichum strictum, and Andreaea species. C. asahinae occurs in Europe, North America, and the southernmost part of South America. It also grows in the Antarctic.

See also
List of Cladonia species
Reindeer lichen

References

asahinae
Lichen species
Lichens described in 1967
Lichens of Europe
Lichens of North America
Taxa named by John Walter Thomson